Sophia of Kiev can refer to:
 Saint Sophia Cathedral, Kyiv
 Queen Sophia of Kiev (c. 1405–1461)